"There Is a Redeemer" is a praise and worship song first written by Melody Green in 1977 and popularized by her husband, contemporary Christian musician Keith Green. It was first released on 1982's Songs for the Shepherd, the last album to be released before his death in a plane crash. The final verse was added by Keith.

The song has been covered by various artists such as Robin Mark, David Nevue, Kathryn Scott, Selah, Kathy Troccoli, Michelle Tumes, Matthew Ward, and Kelly Willard. It appears in twenty hymnals and has been described as a 'classic.'

References

External links 
 Cyber Hymnal - Frequently Requested Hymns 
 Hymnary - There is a Redeemer
 Lorenz Music Co. - There is a Redeemer
 The Trinitarian Theology of Keith Green
 Worship Together - There is a Redeemer

1982 songs
Contemporary worship music
Contemporary Christian songs
Songs about Jesus